Dungarvan is a small village in the parish of Gowran in County Kilkenny, Ireland. It is situated about 10 km south-east of Kilkenny city, on the R448 road between Gowran and Thomastown.

References

Towns and villages in County Kilkenny